Beth Grant (born September 18, 1949) is an American character actress. Between 2012 and 2017, she was a series regular on the television comedy The Mindy Project in the role of Beverly Janoszewski. She is also known for her role as Gracie Leigh in the CBS post-apocalyptic drama Jericho and as Marianne Marie Beetle in Wonderfalls. She has also appeared on Pushing Daisies, and Mockingbird Lane.

In film, she is best known for her roles as Mother at Farm House in Rain Man (1988), Miss Kettlewell in Child's Play 2 (1990), Helen in Speed (1994), Loretta in To Wong Foo, Thanks for Everything! Julie Newmar (1995), Kitty Farmer in Donnie Darko (2001), Pageant Official Jenkins in Little Miss Sunshine (2006), Carla Jean's Mother in No Country for Old Men (2007), and Peppy's maid in The Artist (2011). She starred in the films Flatliners, Sordid Lives, Dear Lemon Lima, Bad Words, Jackie (as Lady Bird Johnson),  Faults (2014) and Lucky (2017). She later portrayed the recurring role of "The Woman with Hair but No Beard" in Netflix's A Series of Unfortunate Events and the Cat Lady in Hulu's Dollface.

Early life
Grant was born on September 18, 1949, in Gadsden, Alabama. She grew up in Wilmington, North Carolina and graduated from New Hanover High School in Wilmington in 1967. Her father was a poultry specialist and salesman. Her mother worked as a manager for the North Carolina Employment Security Commission and was an activist for the Equal Rights Amendment. Grant credits her mother with providing her the inspiration to become an actress. 

Grant graduated from East Carolina University in 1973 with a Bachelor of Fine Arts in Acting and Directing and then moved to New York City to pursue a career in acting.

Career
Grant has appeared in dozens of films, including three Oscar Best Picture winners: Rain Man; Speed; To Wong Foo, Thanks for Everything! Julie Newmar; Love Field; Donnie Darko; A Time to Kill; Little Miss Sunshine; Child's Play 2; Daltry Calhoun; City Slickers II: The Legend of Curly's Gold; Don't Tell Her It's Me; Matchstick Men; Factory Girl; The Wizard; Sordid Lives; The Rookie; All About Steve; No Country for Old Men, Extract, Crazy Heart, Rango, Hollywood to Dollywood (as herself), and Dance with Me.

Grant has appeared in many TV shows, including Coach; Everwood; Delta; The Golden Girls; Malcolm in the Middle; The X-Files; Friends; CSI; Six Feet Under; Wonderfalls; Pushing Daisies; My Name Is Earl; Yes, Dear; King of the Hill; The Office; Angel; Judging Amy; Jericho; Sordid Lives: The Series; Criminal Minds, Sabrina The Teenage Witch; True Blood; How I Met Your Mother; Modern Family; The Mentalist; and The Mindy Project.

Grant played the same character, Marianne Marie Beetle, in the short-lived show Wonderfalls and Pushing Daisies, both created by Bryan Fuller, and portrays the similarly named "Marie" in Mockingbird Lane, Fuller's re-imagining of The Munsters.

Grant guest-starred as Gillian, Brady Kelly's mother, in the third season of the sitcom Husbands.

Inspired by Mindy Kaling, Grant is also in the process of writing a Broadway musical, set in 1969 Greenwich Village.

Personal life
Grant is married to actor Michael Chieffo and has one daughter, actress Mary Chieffo. Grant lives with her family in Los Angeles.

Filmography

Film

Television

Awards and nominations
Ovation Awards
2010: Won the award for Lead Actress in a Play for the role of Grace in the Colony Theatre Company production of Grace & Glorie

References

External links

1949 births
American film actresses
American television actresses
American voice actresses
East Carolina University alumni
Living people
People from Gadsden, Alabama
Actresses from Alabama
20th-century American actresses
21st-century American actresses